Achatinella vulpina is a species of air-breathing land snail, a terrestrial pulmonate gastropod mollusc in the family Achatinellidae. This species is endemic to Hawaii.

Shell description
The dextral or sinistral shell is ovate-conic, and colored glossy yellow, green, olive or chestnut; often banded with green or chestnut. The shell has 6  whorls. The color pattern is extremely variable.

The height of the shell is 19.0 mm. The width of the shell is 10.0 mm.

References
This article incorporates public domain text (a public domain work of the United States Government) from reference.

vulpina
Molluscs of Hawaii
Endemic fauna of Hawaii
Critically endangered fauna of the United States
Gastropods described in 1824
Taxonomy articles created by Polbot
ESA endangered species